Edoardo Piscopo (born 4 February 1988) is an Italian racing driver.

Career

Formula BMW 
After previously competing in karting, Piscopo began his single seater career in Formula BMW USA in 2005, where despite missing the first rounds he finished fifth with three wins for EuroInternational. He also finished fifth in the Bahrain World Final.

Formula Renault 
After winning in Formula BMW USA Piscopo joined the RED BULL Junior Team and  moved back to Europe in 2006 to compete in Formula Renault. In his debut season, he scored ten podiums finishing third in Formula Renault 2.0 Italia for Cram Competition, behind Dani Clos and teammate Adrian Zaugg. He also finished tenth in Eurocup Formula Renault 2.0 for the team.

Formula Three 
Piscopo stepped up to Formula Three in 2007, competing in the Formula Three Euroseries for Mücke Motorsport. He only managed to score eight points in 20 races, finishing 15th in the standings. He did however finish fifth in the 2007 Masters of Formula 3 at Zolder.

He joined A1 Team Italy to drive in the A1 Grand Prix series for the 2007–08 season, sharing duties with Enrico Toccacelo.

He moved to the Italian Formula Three Championship in 2008, scoring seven wins on his way to second in the final standings, behind champion Mirko Bortolotti. They were both given the chance to test for Formula One team Scuderia Ferrari.

FIA Formula Two Championship
Piscopo became the last driver to sign up for the inaugural season of the FIA Formula Two Championship in 2009. He finished twelfth in the championship due to missing the final round to concentrate on his GP2 Asia campaign.

GP2 Series 
Piscopo missed the final round of the Formula Two season as he joined DAMS for the 2009–10 GP2 Asia Series season.

Piscopo made his Main Series début for the Trident team at Monza in 2010. He replaced Johnny Cecotto Jr. He was replaced by Federico Leo at the next round of the championship.

Auto GP 
Piscopo moved to the Auto GP series for 2010. He led the majority of the championship, but was ultimately overhauled by Romain Grosjean.

Blancpain Endurance Series 
Piscopo was appointed by Lotus as factory driver for the Lotus GT4 campaign. Despite winning 3 rounds out of 5, he finished second in the championship.

Porsche Carrera Cup Italia 
Piscopo joined the highly competitive Porsche Carrera Cup.  He won the best rookie title and finished third in the championship.

Lamborghini Super Trofeo 
Piscopo has won the European, the American and the World Championship Super Trofeo title. In 2015 he became the Huracan GT3 factory test driver.

Racing record

Career summary

Complete FIA Formula Two Championship results 
(key) (Races in bold indicate pole position) (Races in italics indicate fastest lap)

Complete GP2 Series results 
(key) (Races in bold indicate pole position) (Races in italics indicate fastest lap)

Complete GP2 Asia Series results 
(key) (Races in bold indicate pole position) (Races in italics indicate fastest lap)

References

External links 
  edoardopiscopo.com
 Career statistic driverdb.com

1988 births
Living people
Racing drivers from Rome
Italian racing drivers
Formula BMW USA drivers
Atlantic Championship drivers
Italian Formula Renault 2.0 drivers
Formula Renault Eurocup drivers
Toyota Racing Series drivers
Formula 3 Euro Series drivers
A1 Team Italy drivers
Auto GP drivers
Euroformula Open Championship drivers
Italian Formula Three Championship drivers
European Le Mans Series drivers
FIA Formula Two Championship drivers
GP2 Asia Series drivers
GP2 Series drivers
Superstars Series drivers
Blancpain Endurance Series drivers
24 Hours of Spa drivers
A1 Grand Prix drivers
Cram Competition drivers
DAMS drivers
Trident Racing drivers
Mücke Motorsport drivers
EuroInternational drivers
Lamborghini Super Trofeo drivers